Lower Clicker is a hamlet in the parish of Menheniot, Cornwall, England, UK.

References

Hamlets in Cornwall